Riverpoint is a two-tower mixed-use building complex located in Limerick, Ireland. Standing at  it is currently the eight-tallest storeyed building in the nation, the sixteenth-tallest on the island of Ireland and the third-tallest in Munster after the Cork County Hall and The Elysian, both in Cork. The Riverpoint development as a whole forms most of the block surrounded by Henry Street (N20), Lower Mallow Street, Russell's Quay and Mill Lane. The only other buildings on the site are an apartment building on the corner of Lower Mallow Street and Henry Street, and the Eircom building on Henry Street.

Features

The complex has a restaurant, fitness centre and a 250-space underground car park along with 13 floors of offices. There are 137 apartments in total between both towers, including an office penthouse on the 14th floor.

Location 

It is situated on the site of St. Munchin's House, which housed the Department of Agriculture who have since moved into Riverpoint. St. Munchin's House was built in the 1960s and since then has been an eyesore and was dubbed one of the "ugliest" buildings in Limerick. The main tower of the Riverpoint complex was built alongside St. Munchin's House, with the latter being demolished as the second tower opened in 2007. The main Riverpoint tower is situated on the riverfront of Limerick city, on the corner of Lower Mallow Street (N18) and Russell's Quay, facing the Shannon Bridge over the River Shannon.

References

External links 
Emporis.com

Buildings and structures in Limerick (city)
Skyscraper office buildings in the Republic of Ireland
Residential skyscrapers
Office buildings in the Republic of Ireland
Skyscrapers in the Republic of Ireland
Apartment buildings in the Republic of Ireland